HSC Incat 045 is a fast ferry operated by Trasmapi.

In 2002, the catamaran was sent to Europe on charter, operating with Italian company TRIS during that year, before being chartered by SpeedFerries for its Dover to Boulogne-sur-Mer service. Renamed HSC SpeedOne, she operated on this route until she was impounded by French authorities in late 2008, as the company had failed to pay taxes. SpeedFerries was placed into administration shortly after, and the ferry was laid up until 2010, when she was purchased by Condor Ferries and renamed Condor Rapide. She was then sold in 2021 to Trasmapi, a Spanish ferry operator

Construction and early operating history
Constructed by Incat in its Tasmanian shipyard and named Incat 045, the  catamaran was launched in November 1997. She was chartered out to TT-Line between 14–27 July 1997 as a ferry between Victoria and Tasmania, then was returned to the shipyard. In May 1999, the catamaran was chartered by the Australian government for logistics and transport operations.

The ship was primarily used as a troop and equipment transport between Darwin and Dili in support of the International Force for East Timor (INTERFET) peacekeeping operation. Jervis Bay was decommissioned on 11 May 2001, resuming her original name. In 2002, Incat 045 was chartered to Italian ferry company TRIS and sailed between Genoa and Palau, Italy under the marketing name of Winner until the collapse of the company later that year.

SpeedFerries service
Following the collapse of TRIS, the ferry was laid up in Portland, United Kingdom until 2004. The ferry was chartered by SpeedFerries, renamed HSC SpeedOne, and registered in Dover, England. The ferry was assigned to operate between Dover and Boulogne-sur-Mer in France.

On 28 December 2007, SpeedOne collided with the Prince of Wales Pier in Dover, ripping a hole in the side of the ferry. No passengers were aboard at the time, and the damage was repaired for the ship to resume operations on 31 December.

On 6 November 2008, SpeedOne was detained in Boulogne-sur-Mer in a dispute over non-paid harbour duties and taxes. SpeedFerries was placed into administration on 13 November, and services were cancelled. The ferry was detained until 20 November, when she left France and sailed to Tilbury, where she was laid up awaiting charter.

On 11 May 2009, HSC SpeedOne was renamed Sea Leopard. In the early summer of 2009 the vessel was given a single voyage dispensation and moved from Tilbury to A&P Falmouth to undergo repairs and reactivation, where she remained for around three months. On completion of works, including a full overhaul on all four main engines, she returned to Tilbury in September 2009 to await sale.

Condor Ferries
On 26 March 2010 it was announced that the vessel had been purchased by Condor Ferries and renamed Condor Rapide, replacing  on the Guernsey / Jersey to St. Malo route.

Condor Rapide transports both vehicles and foot passengers between the Channel Islands and France and due to the higher ramp capacity, larger freight vehicles are able to use ro-ro services that were previously unavailable on a daily scheduled basis. The vessel was sold to Spanish ferry operator Trasmapi in 2021

References

http://www.doverferryphotosforums.co.uk/hsc-peed-one-incat-045-past-and-present/

External links
 Condor Ferries Homepage

Ships built by Incat
Ferries of the United Kingdom
Ferries of France
1997 ships
Incat high-speed craft